Kings, Illinois may refer to several places:
Kings, Coles County, Illinois, an unincorporated community in Coles County
Kings, Ogle County, Illinois, an unincorporated community in Ogle County